Muhammad Akhtar Raza Khan Azhari (23 November 1943 – 20 July 2018), also known as Tajush Shari'ah or Azhari Miya, was an Indian Barelvi Muslim scholar, cleric and mufti. He was the great grandson of Ahmed Raza Khan Barelvi who was considered to be a Mujaddid by his followers and was the founder of the Barelvi movement.  He was recognised by Barelvi Muslims as the Grand Mufti of India. He was ranked 22nd on the list of The 500 Most Influential Muslims in the world (2014–15 edition), compiled by the Royal Islamic Strategic Studies Centre. He had tens of millions of followers in India.

Early life 
He was born on 23 November 1943 in Bareilly, British India, great-grandson of Ahmed Raza Khan Barelvi who was considered to be a Mujaddid by his followers and founder of the Barelvi movement.

He went to school at the Manzar-e-Islam madrassa of the Dargah Aala Hazrat, and then at Islamia Inter College, Bareilly. He studied at Al-Azhar University in Egypt from 1963–66, where he won the "Fakhre Azhar" (pride of Azhar) award.

In 1967, he became a teacher at the Manzar-e-Islam madrasa in Bareilly.

After retirement 
He formally retired from teaching in 1980, but continued to issue fatwa, and holding seminars for students at Dar al-Ifta.

In 2000, he founded the Centre of Islamic Studies Jamiatur Raza based in Bareilly, Uttar Pradesh, India.

He was considered by his followers as the Grand Mufti of India.
He had been ranked 22nd on the list of The 500 Most Influential Muslims in the world (2014–15 edition), compiled by the Royal Islamic Strategic Studies Centre. He had tens of millions of followers in India.

He died following a long illness on 20 July 2018, aged 74. The estimated attendance at his funeral was just under one million. His funeral occurred  on 22 July 2018 at Islamia Inter College, Bareilly. The prayer was led by his son and successor Asjad Raza Khan.

After his death Mohammad Salim Noori, spokesperson of the Dargah Aala Hazrat, said Azhari was "the lone cleric in India to get a title of 'Tajushariya'" and "one of the few prominent persons across the world to be allowed to visit the inside [of the] Kaaba in Mecca."

Publications

Rulings (Fatwas)
His Urdu-language fatwa collection was known as Majmu'ah Fatawa. His English collection is named Azharul Fatawa. One of his fatwas was his edict on the interest given to a Muslim by a non-Muslim:

When there is a dealing between a Muslim and a Muslim or a Muslim and a Zimmi Kaffir (a non-Muslim living in the safety
of an Islamic state), the taking more money than loaned is considered as interest and such a dealing will be unlawful. However, if this condition does not exist, this excess money will not be considered as interest and will be legitimate for a Muslim as it is unanimous that there is no interest applicable when there is dealing between a Muslim and a Harbi Kaafir (a non-Muslim who is not living in the safety of an Islamic State).

Poetry
His composition of Na`at was entitled Safina e Bakhshish, written in three languages.

Books
He was the author of "more than 50 books on Islamic theology and thought in Urdu and Arabic", including:
 Hijrat-e-Rasool 
 Aasaar-e-Qiyamat
 Al-Haq-ul-Mubeen (Arabic and Urdu) 
 Safeenah-e-Bakhshish (Na'at collection)
 Fatawa Taj-us-Shari'ah

Family tree

See also

 Ahmad Raza Khan
 Mustafa Raza Khan Qadri
 Hamid Raza Khan
 Tauqeer Raza Khan

References

External links
Life History of Mufti Akhtar Raza Khan Qadri
 Website of Jamiatur Raza

1943 births
2018 deaths
Indian muftis
20th-century Muslim scholars of Islam
21st-century Muslim scholars of Islam
Sunni Muslim scholars of Islam
Barelvis
People from Bareilly
Grand Muftis of India
Akhtar
Indian people of Pashtun descent
Al-Azhar University alumni